Glen or Glenn Andrews may refer to:
Glen Andrews (footballer) (born 1945), English footballer

Glenn Andrews (1909–2008), U.S. Congressman from Alabama

Glen Andrews, musician on Robbie Robertson's album Storyville
Glenn Andrews (author), wrote Murder is Dominant, part of Alfred Hitchcock's Anthology – Volume 5